Felix Morf (born 5 January 1962) is a Swiss breaststroke swimmer. He competed in two events at the 1984 Summer Olympics.

References

External links
 

1962 births
Living people
Swiss male breaststroke swimmers
Olympic swimmers of Switzerland
Swimmers at the 1984 Summer Olympics
Place of birth missing (living people)